David Abel may refer to:

 David Abel (general) (1935–2019), Myanmar Army general and cabinet minister
 David Abel (cinematographer) (1883–1973), cinematographer

See also 
 David Abell (disambiguation)